Cutibacterium granulosum is a bacterium that may stimulate the immune system to fight cancer.

References 
 Corynebacterium granulosum entry in the public domain NCI Dictionary of Cancer Terms

Propionibacteriales
Gram-positive bacteria
Bacteria described in 1938